Esperanza is the second studio album by American bassist and singer Esperanza Spalding. It was released on May 20, 2008 by Heads Up International.

Having been exposed to many cultures while growing up, Spalding sings in three languages on the album: English, Spanish and Portuguese. After Spalding's Grammy Award win in February 2011, the album entered the Billboard 200 at 138.

Critical reception

Thom Jurek of AllMusic stated, "On this recording she seeks to widen her musical adventure at every turn, but she does it with such with taste, refinement, and a playful sense of humor that virtually anyone who encounters this offering will find not only much to delight in, but plenty to be amazed by as well." Myles Tanzer in his book Music Is My Life: Soundtrack Your Mood With 80 Artists for Every Occasion commented, "...on that album she sings in three languages, sings her heart out, and plays masterfully." Nate Chinen of Vibe added, "Like the basketball that shares her name, Spalding bounces around. But this album doesn’t make a slapdash show of eclecticism. Spalding has fashioned something cohesive and diverse, calling upon a strong coalition of musicians and the depth of her own skills. It’s clear Esperanza’s definitely got game—and has no hung-ups about showing it." Jeff Winbush of All About Jazz added that the album "flat-out smokes, and showcases the Berklee-trained bassist as potentially one of the more promising young talents in jazz."

Track listing

Personnel
 Esperanza Spalding – electric bass, acoustic bass, vocals
 Leo Genovese – piano, Wurlitzer electric piano (track 7), Fender Rhodes piano (track 10) 
 Jamey Haddad – percussion
 Otis Brown – drums
 Horacio Hernandez – drums (tracks 4 and 8)
 Ambrose Akinmusire – trumpet (tracks 8 and 11)
 Donald Harrison – saxophone (tracks 6 and 11)
 Gretchen Parlato – background vocals (tracks 1 and 4)

Chart performance
Esperanza spent over 70 weeks on the Billboard Top Jazz Albums Chart.

References

Heads Up International albums
2008 albums
Esperanza Spalding albums
Spanish-language albums